Test cricket is the oldest form of cricket played at international level. A Test match takes place over a period of five days, and is played by teams representing Full Member nations of the International Cricket Council (ICC). Sri Lanka obtained Full Member status of the ICC in 1981, becoming the eighth nation eligible to play Test cricket. The Sri Lanka national cricket team played their first Test match on 17 February 1982, against England, and recorded their first victory on 6 September 1985, in a match against India. Since then, they have played nearly 300 matches, against every other Test-playing nation. Sri Lanka holds the world record for the highest team score, which was established against India in 1997. The highest partnership in Test cricket was also established by two Sri Lankan batsmen; Mahela Jayawardene and Kumar Sangakkara. Sri Lankan players also hold the highest partnership scores for the second and third wickets.

Top order batsman and former captain Kumar Sangakkara holds several Sri Lankan batting records as he has scored the most runs for Sri Lanka in Test cricket. He is also the record holder for the highest number of centuries as well as the highest number of half-centuries. The 374 made by Mahela Jayawardene against South Africa in 2006 is the highest individual score by a Sri Lankan cricketer, surpassing the previous best of 340 by Sanath Jayasuriya, which was established in 1997. It is also the fourth-highest individual score in Test cricket. Jayawardene, Jayasuriya and Kumar Sangakkara [319] are the only Sri Lankan players who have scored triple centuries.

Muttiah Muralitharan, who was hailed by the Wisden Cricketers' Almanack in 2002 as the "best bowler ever" in Test cricket, dominates the bowling records for Sri Lanka. He is the world record holder for the highest number of wickets, the most five wickets per innings, as well as the most ten wickets per match. Muralitharan also holds the records for the best bowling average, best figures in an innings, best figures in a match, and best figures in a series. He missed an opportunity to capture all ten wickets in an innings in 2002 against Zimbabwe, when Chaminda Vaas took the last wicket after Muralitharan had taken the previous nine.
The Sri Lankan team won an ODI series against Australia in Australia in 2010. However, they are yet to register a Test match win and an ODI series win against India in India, as of 2017.

Sri Lanka holds a unique record of having the most Test wickets by both a right arm and left arm bowler:: Muralitharan with 800 wickets and Rangana Herath with 433 wickets.

Key
The top five records are listed for each category, except for the team wins, losses, draws and ties and the partnership records. Tied records for fifth place are also included. Explanations of the general symbols and cricketing terms used in the list are given below. Specific details are provided in each category where appropriate. All records include matches played for Sri Lanka only, and are correct .

Team records

Team wins, losses, and draws

First Test series wins

First Test match wins

Team scoring records

Most runs in an innings

Highest successful run chases

Fewest runs in an innings

Most runs conceded in an innings

Least runs conceded in an innings

Result records
A Test match is won when one side has scored more runs than the total runs scored by the opposing side during their two innings. If both sides have completed both their allocated innings and the side that fielded last has the higher aggregate of runs, it is known as a win by runs. This indicates the number of runs that they had scored more than the opposing side. If one side scores more runs in a single innings than the total runs scored by the other side in both their innings, it is known as a win by innings and runs. If the side batting last wins the match, it is known as a win by wickets, indicating the number of wickets that were still to fall.

Greatest win margins (by innings)

Greatest win margins (by runs)

Greatest win margins (by 10 wickets)

Narrowest win margins (by runs)

Narrowest win margins (by wickets)

Greatest loss margins (by innings)

Greatest loss margins (by runs)

Greatest loss margins (by 10 wickets)

Narrowest loss margins (by runs)

Narrowest loss margins (by wickets)

Individual records

Batting records

Most career runs
Kumar Sangakkara is the fifth-highest scoring batsman in Test cricket.

Fastest runs getter

Most runs in each batting position

Most runs against each team

Highest individual score

Highest individual score – progression of record

Highest individual score against each team

Highest career average

In cricket, batting average is the mean number of runs scored per innings. It is calculated by dividing total runs scored (including innings where he remained not out) by the number of times the batsman has been dismissed.

Highest Average in each batting position

Most Test half-centuries

Most Test centuries

Most Test double centuries

Most triple centuries

Most Sixes

Most Fours

Highest batting strike rate

Most runs in a series

Most ducks in career
"Duck" refers to a batsman dismissed without scoring.

Bowling records

Most wickets in a career
Muralitharan, who is the highest wicket-taker in Test cricket, has taken 5 wickets for the ICC World XI team during a match in 2005, which are not included in this list. Muralitharan and Shane Warne—who ranks second with 708 wickets—are the only bowlers who have captured more than 700 Test wickets.

Most career wickets against each team

Fastest wicket taker

Best figures in an innings
Muttiah Muralitharan's 9 wickets for 51 runs against Zimbabwe is Test cricket's fifth-best bowling figures in a single innings. Also Rangana Herath's 9 wickets for 127 runs against Pakistan is the Best bowling figures by a left hand bowler in Test cricket history.

Best figures in an innings against each team

Best figures in a match
The Sri Lankan record of 16 wickets for 220 runs set by Muttiah Muralitharan against England is the fifth-best figures by a bowler in a single Test match.

Best career average
Bowling average is the measurement of mean runs conceded per wicket. In calculating this the total number of runs conceded by the bowler is divided by the number of wickets captured.

Best career economy rate
A bowler's economy rate is the total number of runs they have conceded divided by the number of overs they have bowled.

Best career strike rate
A bowler's strike rate is the total number of balls they have bowled divided by the number of wickets they have taken.

Most five-wicket hauls in an innings
Taking five or more wickets in a single innings (called a five-wicket haul, fifer or five-for) is considered a notable achievement for a bowler. Muralitharan is well ahead of other bowlers by number of five-wicket hauls in Tests with 67 to his name; Australian cricketer Shane Warne ranks in second place with only 37, 30 below Murali. Which shows the class of Murali in bowling compared to Warne.

Most ten-wickets in a match
Muralitharan has taken ten or more wickets in a match on more occasions than any other bowler in Test cricket. He has performed this feat 22 times, more than double the number of the bowler ranking second—Shane Warne, who has achieved this on 10 occasions.

Worst figures in an innings

Worst figures in a match

Most wickets in a series

Hat-trick
In cricket, a hat-trick occurs when a bowler takes three wickets with consecutive deliveries. The deliveries may be interrupted by an over bowled by another bowler from the other end of the pitch or the other team's innings, but must be three consecutive deliveries by the individual bowler in the same match. Only wickets attributed to the bowler count towards a hat-trick; run outs do not count.

Wicket-keeping records

A wicketkeeper can assist in the dismissal of a batsman by taking a catch or stumping. A catch taken by the wicketkeeper means the batsman will be ruled out caught, although it may be referred to as "caught behind". A stumping occurs when the wicketkeeper catches a ball delivered by the bowler (provided it is a legal delivery) and putting down the batsman's wicket while he is out of his ground.

Most dismissals

Most catches

Most stumpings

Most dismissals in an innings

Most dismissals in a match

Most dismissals in a series

Fielding records

Most catches in a career
A "catch" occurs when a ball hit by the batsman in the air is held by a fielder within the field of play, before it hits the ground. In such a case, the batsman is ruled out caught.

Most catches in a series

All-round Records

1000 runs and 100 wickets
A total of 71 players have achieved the double of 1000 runs and 100 wickets in their Test career.

Other records

Most career matches

Most consecutive career matches

Most matches played as captain

Most man of the match awards

Most man of the series awards

Youngest players on Debut

Oldest players on debut

Oldest players

Partnership records

Highest wicket partnerships

Sri Lanka holds the highest partnerships in Test cricket for any wicket and, with the records for the second, and third wickets.

Highest partnerships

The world record partnership between Jayawardene and Sangakkara for 624 runs, and the partnership between Jayasuriya and Mahanama for 576 runs (which was the previous world record, and is now the second-highest partnership in Tests) are the only Test partnerships to surpass 500 runs.

Highest overall partnership runs by a pair

Umpiring records

See also
 Cricket statistics
 List of Test cricket records

Notes

References

Test cricket records
Sri Lanka in international cricket
records